The Embassy of the United Kingdom in Brussels is the chief diplomatic mission of the United Kingdom in Belgium. 

The Embassy is located at 10 Avenue d’Auderghem and the building also hosts the UK's Mission to the EU (UKMis).

Martin Shearman has been the British Ambassador to Belgium since June 2019.

The Embassy also represents the British Overseas Territories in Belgium.

History
The original British mission was located at Hotel de Rodes, on the corner of Rue de Spa and Rue de la Loi, it served as the Embassy building until it was evacuated at the outbreak of the Second World War. After the war, the Embassy outgrew the building and the Ambassador's residence was moved to Rue Ducale. The embassy expanded into buildings on  nearby Rue Joseph II. In the 1960s as the pressure grew on the building, the Embassy and mission to the EEC moved to a purposefully built Britannia House. In the 1970s the UK Mission to the EEC moved out of the Britannia House to 6 Rond-Point Schuman. The bilateral embassy however resided at Britannia House until the 1990s when it moved to 85 Rue d’Arlon.

Nowadays, both the bilateral embassy and the UK Mission to the EU reside at 10 Avenue d’Auderghem. The UK also maintains a separate delegation to NATO based in Brussels based at the NATO HQ at Boulevard Leopold III.

Ambassador's residence

The British Ambassador's official residence, the former Hôtel de Croÿ, is located at 17 Rue Ducale. The building was built by architect Louis Sauvage around 1911-1913. It is a large and elegant terraced town house facing the Parc Royal. The building was acquired by the British government after the restoration of the Embassy following the end of the Second World War. The owner was Mme. Renée de Becker-Rémy who originally leased the building to the British Ministry of Works and then sold the house and some of its furniture in 1947.

See also
Belgium-United Kingdom relations
List of diplomatic missions in Belgium
List of ambassadors of the United Kingdom to Belgium

References

Brussels
Buildings and structures in Brussels
Belgium–United Kingdom relations